Kagwa Bushenyi High School is a government secondary school located in Ward II Parish, Bushenyi Tc Sub county in Igara, along Kasese-Mbarara Highway. Uganda.

P.O.BOX 84

St.Kaggwa Bushenyi High School is a Catholic, boarding boys school in Bushenyi. It excels in both science and art subjects.
The Motto of the High School is WE LABOUR FOR OUR FUTURE.

Secondary schools in Uganda
Boarding schools in Uganda